Diospyros artanthifolia is a species of tree in the family Ebenaceae. It is native to Panama and tropical South America.

References 

artanthifolia
Trees of Peru
Trees of Panama
Trees of Colombia
Trees of Bolivia
Trees of French Guiana
Trees of Brazil
Trees of Venezuela
Taxa named by Friedrich Anton Wilhelm Miquel